Crossroads to Islam: The Origins of the Arab Religion and the Arab State is a book by archaeologist Yehuda D. Nevo and researcher  Judith Koren. The book presents a radical theory of the origins and development of the Islamic state and religion based on archeological, epigraphical and historiographical research.

Methodology

Using a historical methodology the authors examined not only Muslim literature but hitherto neglected sources datable to before the 9th century such as  archaeological excavations, numismatics, rock inscriptions and the records of the local non-Muslim populations.

They provide a large selection of inscriptions until now overlooked and uncited in the traditional histories, which for the most part are datable to the 7th and 8th centuries, and use them to trace an historical narrative considerably different from the traditional accounts.

Thesis

From the archeological evidence and the lack thereof from the 7th century and Islamic period, the authors cast doubt onto the veracity of the traditional accounts of early Islamic origins that are still cited as fact in most history books.  Notably, the archeological, epigraphical and historiographical evidence provides, according to the authors a view of the Middle East of the 7th and 8th century that lacks the preeminence of any "prophet" or the existence of a  religion that would later come to be known as Islam.

Based on the evidence that is presented in the book the authors conclude that

 Traditional Islamic narratives of the 7th and 8th century are a complete construct and cannot stand up to historical examination on the basis of archeological and epigraphical evidence and non-Muslim records. (For example, early Christian sources do not mention the "rightly guided caliphs" nor any of the famous futūḥ battles—the early Arab-Muslim conquests which facilitated the spread of Islam and Islamic civilization—and that coins of the region and era used Byzantine—not Islamic—iconography until the reign of Abd al-Malik ibn Marwan (686-705 CE).)
 The Arabs were in fact pagan when they assumed power in the 7th century in the regions formerly ruled by the Byzantine Empire.
 There was no Arab conquest of eastern Byzantine provinces. Byzantium had effectively withdrawn from the area long before, and placed Arab tribes as "clients" (foederati) in their stead. Arabs eventually took control almost without a struggle.
Muawiyah I (traditionally described as the first Umayyad Caliph), was the first historical ruler of the Arab Empire, and arose as a warlord/strongman from the other foederati.
 After taking control, the Arabs adopted a simple monotheism based on Judaeo-Christianity, which they encountered in their newly occupied territories, and gradually developed it into an Arab religion which culminated in Islam in the mid-8th century.
 The Quran was not fully codified until the Abbasid era when the development of a legal code (Sharia) distinct from the Byzantine code used by the Umayyad. The Sharia needed a formalized scripture  to claim that the code was derived from through exegesis and so "prophetical logia" was canonized  as the Word of God.

The evidence presented by the authors effectively corroborate the view of other scholars, such as Fred Donner's historiographical work, John Wansbrough or Patricia Crone and Michael Cook's book Hagarism who on different grounds propose that Islam and the Qu'ran were not the work of Muhammad.

Quote
Since external evidence is necessary to corroborate a view derived solely from the Muslim literary account, lack of such corroboration is an important argument against that account's historicity. This approach is therefore more open than the 'traditional' to acceptance of an argumentum e silentio. For if we are ready to discount an uncorroborated report of an event, we must accept that there may be nothing with which to replace it: that the event simply did not happen. That there is no evidence for it outside of the "traditional account" thus becomes positive evidence in support of the hypothesis that it did not happen. A striking example is the lack of evidence, outside the Muslim literature, for the view that the Arabs were Muslim at the time of the Conquest.

Reception

A review in the Middle East Quarterly by David Cook notes that the book covers new ground not addressed by previous works, as the authors delve into areas of archeology and epigraphy to support their thesis. Cooks finds that the book "employs a very rigorous, historical methodology", and the results to be "plausible or at least arguable".

On the other hand, Colin Wells, writing for the Bryn Mawr Classical Review, writes "like Holocaust deniers the authors don't merely question some aspects of the consensus view, they reject it wholesale".  Wells critiques the authors for taking skepticism of early Islam too far, noting that while there are other works that question the historicity of early Islam, the "authors are unusual only in rejecting the traditional version outright, not in interrogating it".

Further reading

The Quest for the Historical Muhammad
Hagarism: The Making of the Islamic World
Narratives of Islamic Origins: The Beginnings of Islamic Historical Writing

References

Citations

Bibliography

Crossroads to Islam: The Origins of the Arab Religion and the Arab State
History books about Islam
2003 non-fiction books
Prometheus Books books